Why Shit So Crazy? (stylized as Why S#!+ So Crazy? on the DVD cover) is a one-hour stand-up comedy special by Reggie Watts, aired and then released as a dual DVD/CD package by Comedy Central in 2010. The special features Watts in live performance at New York venues Galapagos, The Bellhouse, and Le Poisson Rouge, bookended with brief sketches and a music video of Watts' "Fuck Shit Stack". Next to stand-up comedy, songs, and freestyle rapping, the DVD/CD contains special features and deleted scenes, all completely uncensored and uncut.

References

2010 comedy films
2010s English-language films